Digby Willoughby, 7th Baron Middleton (29 November 1769 – 5 November 1856), was an English nobleman and sailor.

He was the eldest son of Francis Willoughby of Hesley and Octavia Fisher, and grandson of Thomas Willoughby.

He entered the Royal Navy in 1782, retiring as a captain in 1840.

He never married but had one illegitimate daughter, Octavia. He lived in the Willoughby family seat at Wollaton Park, Nottinghamshire.

References

See also
 

1769 births
1856 deaths
Royal Navy officers
Digby 7